Lidia Zielińska (born 9 October 1953) is a Polish composer and music educator.

Biography
Lidia Zielińska was born in Poznań, Poland. She graduated from the State Higher School of Music in Poznań in 1979 after studying composition under Andrzej Koszewski. She also studied composition and electronic music in Poland and at 'Musicultura' in Breukelen, the M. Deutsch Symphonic Workshop in Paris, IRCAM courses in Kraków and the Polish Society for Contemporary Music courses in Rydzyna and Wzdów.

Zielińska took a position as professor of composition at the Poznań Academy of Music, and worked as a violinist in the Poznań Philharmonic Orchestra and the Agnieszka Duczmal Chamber Orchestra. She also taught at the State Higher School of Visual Arts, Wrocław Academy of Music, and was a guest lecturer for summer courses in Poland, France, the Netherlands, Germany, Switzerland, Sweden, Belarus and Moldova.

Zielińska received a number of prizes for her compositions in Poland, Yugoslavia, Germany, Switzerland and France. In 1993/94, she worked with the EuroMusicTheater project, and in 1994/95 was part of the Donau Ballet project. In 1995/96 she was the composer-in-residence at the Electronic Music Studio in Stockholm. She has also worked with the Eighth Day Theatre with Izabella Gustowska, Jan Berdyszak and Aleksandra Korejwo.

From 1982 to 1992, Zielińska was artistic director of the "Poznań Music Spring" festival. She has been a board member of the Polish Society for Contemporary Music, secretary of the Coordination Committee for Creative and Visual Art Circles, a member of the Polish Composers' Union, and a member of the "Warsaw Autumn" repertoire committee.  She has been president of the "House of World Rhythms" foundation, and is co-founder of the Brevis music editions and Monochord quarterly.

Works
Zielińska has composed for chamber ensembles, stage, orchestra, voice and solo instrument. She has also composed theatre and film music.  Selected works include:

Stage
Listen, Joe, monodrama for mime, tape and orchestra based on Samuel *Beckett – 1978
Mrs. Koch, tragicomedy for solo voices, tape recorders, vocal and instrumental ensembles – 1981
Cascando, for actors and double mixed choir to a text by Samuel *Beckett – 1983/91
Huit heures de la vie des femmes, musical theatre for 9 performers – 1988
The Same, performance – 1988
In the Field, minispectacle – 1990
Voices, performance – 1992
Zeitschlingen, sound spectacle – 1994
Venture Unknown, ballet – 1995

Orchestral
Violin Concerto – 1979
Farewell to Toorope for orchestra – 1981
Epitaph in memoriam Poznan June 1956 for orchestra – 1981
Fiction for orchestra – 1986
Little Atrophic Symphony for orchestra – 1988

Chamber music
Litany for string quartet – 1979
Minuten – Sonate for optional instrument – 1981
Two Dances for strings – 1981
Treaty for oboe quartet – 1982
Sonnet on the Tatras for 5 musicians – 1985
Pleonasmus for oboe, violin and string orchestra – 1986
String Quartet – 1988
Jacquard for 14 musicians – 1991
La Vetrata for young string orchestra – 1996

Solo instruments
Gagaku Lullaby for double bass – 1984
Glossa for violin or viola solo (1986)

Vocal
Concrete Music for choir and orchestra – 1987
Music for Holy Week for mixed choir and percussion – 1988
TOGO Unit for male choir and piano – 1995*

Electroacoustic
Artificial Cult for tape, video tape, neons and visual objects – 1985
Heldenleben.
Overheard and Spied on for audio tape, video tape and shadowgraph – 1986
Polish Dances According to Priest Baka for tape – 1986
Feature Piece for saxophone and tape – 1987
Musica humana or How Symphonies Are Born radio piece (Horspiel) – 1989
Graphic 2 for 10 instruments and live electronics – 1991
Fago for bassoon, double-bass, accordion and electronic keyboard – 1992
Short piece for flute and computer or computer and tape – 1992
Like These White Mice, radio piece – 1996
Expandata for percussion and tape – 1997

Mixed media
AKO, cartoon (together with Aleksandra Korejwo) – 1986

Music for children
Kaleidoscope – Passacaglia for percussion, slides and clapping hands, for children – 1987
Piece about Everything for percussion and children audience – 1988
Sound Museum, "live" installation for children – 1988
Soaked Music, with children audience, narrator, conductor and tape – 1993

References

1953 births
Living people
20th-century classical composers
Polish composers
Women classical composers
Musicians from Poznań
20th-century women composers
Polish women composers